Argyria interrupta is a moth in the family Crambidae. It was described by Zeller in 1866. It is found in Venezuela.

References

Argyriini
Moths described in 1866
Moths of South America